HMS Tulip was a  that served in the Royal Navy. The corvette was launched by Smiths Dock Company on 4 September 1940 and was commissioned into the Royal Navy on 18 November 1940.

Civilian service
She was sold in 1947 and rebuilt as the whaling ship Olympic Conqueror in 1950. She was seized in 1954 by Peruvian warships and was sold to Japan in 1956 as the Otori Maru No. 8. In 1957 she was sold to Thor Dahl AS and renamed Thorlyn. In 1962 she was laid up in Sandefjord and then sold in 1964 at Gothenburg, Sweden. She was scrapped in Germany in 1965.

External links
HMS Tulip on the Arnold Hague database at convoyweb.org.uk.

 

Flower-class corvettes of the Royal Navy
1940 ships
Ships built on the River Tees